Bahr-e Beyg (also Romanized as Baḩr-e Beyg, Baḩr Beyg, and Bahr Beyg; also known as Bagribāi, Bagri-Bay, Bahr Beik, Bahr Beyk, and Bāqer Beyg) is a village in Sina Rural District, in the Central District of Varzaqan County, East Azerbaijan Province, Iran. At the 2006 census, its population was 108, in 22 families.

References 

Towns and villages in Varzaqan County